Finnerty is a surname of Irish origin. It literally means "Fair snow".

The Celtic version of the name "Finnerty" is "Fionnachta" or "O' Fionnachta";
"Fionnachta" is a composite of two Celtic words: Fionn and Sneachta; Fionn in Celtic means "fair" - as in shade of white, and Sneachta means "snow"; "Fionn-Sneachta" (i.e. "fair snow" literally - but meaning “snow-white") was a man or a woman with snow-white hair, or snow-white skin: or possibly both. It seems people of such appearance were greatly revered by the ancient Celts.

Similarly for people with snow-white skin and red hair; and Queen Meave of Connacht - who the ancient Celts believed was a goddess (and not a human being) – is thought to be one such person.

There is a very similar Celtic word to "Fionnachta" (which can be seen in modern Irish Language dictionaries) spelled "Fionnachtaí"; and the English meanings given are "discoverer" and "inventor". Whether or not there is any substantial relationship between the origins of these two words is not known.

When Ireland came fully under English control (in the 1600s) all, or almost all, Celtic family names (and place names) were forced through a very "rough and ready, any old way will do" translation process which was highly distorting: often (and perhaps deliberately) to an extent which meant the result was completely meaningless in all languages.

In this hit-or-miss way, busy English scribes – who would have had no knowledge of Celtic languages (or very little) – quickly wrote down place names on maps, and drew up lists of tenants' names etc., based on what they heard and what was easiest for them to pronounce. Under these circumstances, Ó Fionnachta was transformed into Finnerty by one scribe, to O'Finaghty or Finaghty by another, and so on.  Some of the other variations we know of include: O'Fenaghty, Fenaughty, Finaughity, Feenaghty, Fennaghty, Fennaughty, Finerty, Finnearty, O'Finnearty, Finnarty, Fennerty, Fenerty, Fenety, Fenarty, and Finnesty.

Had the English scribes been more accurate then, "Ó Fionnachta" would probably have been translated to "Fairsnow", or "Snowfair".

The earliest written recorded reference regarding a permanent Finnerty "birth place" appears in the "Annals of the Four Masters" (written between 1632 and 1636); and it very firmly links the Ó Fionnachta family with an ancient fortress where Donamon Castle which stands approximately 10 miles due west of Roscommon town (in the Province of Connacht). The site on which Donamon Castle now stands is believed to be one of the very oldest and longest inhabited sites in Ireland. (Since 1939 it has been home to the Irish branch of the Divine Word Missionaries community.)
There are further references linking "Fionn Sneachta" kings to Ulster, Rathcrogan, and Tara.

According to Annals of the Four Masters, the first "Fionn Sneachta" King of Ireland reigned from 1277 to 1257 BC.

Notable people with the surname Finnerty:
 Anthony Finnerty, Gaelic footballer for Mayo and father of Robert
 Collin Finnerty, one of the three falsely accused students in the 2006 Duke University lacrosse case
 Cullen Finnerty (1982–2013), Grand Valley State University football team quarterback
 Dan Finnerty, American actor
 Isobel Finnerty, Canadian senator
 John J. Finnerty (1879-1958), American politician and barber
 Maurice P. Finnerty, mayor of Penticton, British Columbia from 1962 to 1967
 Pat Finnerty, American musician
 Robert Finnerty, Gaelic footballer for Galway and son of Anthony

Fictional
 Finnerty, a family on the American television series Grounded for Life
 Kevin Finnerty, a dream alias of Tony Soprano on the HBO television series The Sopranos
 Ed Finnerty is a character in the 1967 Kurt Vonnegut novel Player Piano

References

Surnames of Irish origin